Kolby is a surname. Notable people with the surname include:

Kristian Kolby (born 1978), Danish racing driver
Ole Peter Kolby (born 1939), Norwegian diplomat
Ross Kolby (born 1970), Norwegian visual artist and author

See also
Colby (surname)
Kolby (given name)